Off The Mark is a comic panel created by Mark Parisi which began in September 1987 and now appears in 100 newspapers. It also appears on greeting cards, in magazines, on T-shirts and more. Off The Mark is distributed daily by Andrews McMeel Syndication.

The humor of this comic panel focuses on off-beat, slice-of-life situations. Andrews McMeel Universal describes it as: "A world of scheming pets, evil computers, and talking plants that puts an ironic, absurd or just plain silly spin on everyday life."

Off The Mark was named "Best Newspaper Panel" by the National Cartoonists Society in 2008, and again in 2011. It was also nominated in 2004, 2006, 2013, and 2016. Off The Mark greeting cards were named "Best Greeting Cards" by the National Cartoonists Society in 2013.

References

External links
 
 off the mark on GoComics.com

1987 comics debuts
Gag cartoon comics
Slice of life comics
American comic strips
Comics set in the 1980s
Comics set in the 1990s
Comics set in the 2000s
Comics set in the 2010s
Comics set in the United States